The Sechelt Indian Band, also known as the shishalh first nation, is a First Nations band government located in the southern Sunshine Coast region of British Columbia, Canada.  They were an early signatory with the BC government on land claims, and today their former Indian Reserves are now the Sechelt Indian Government District, which has municipal status and comprises 33 land units ("SB" - Sechelt Band Land Units) in the area.

Treaty Process
They have reached Stage 5 in the BC Treaty Process.  Negotiating independently with Canada and British Columbia.  Sechelt Indian Band negotiated with Murray Rankin on behalf of British Columbia to reach the first Agreement in Principle under the auspices of the British Columbia Treaty Commission.

Demographics
Number of Band Members: 1,237

See also
Sechelt people
Sháshíshálh language

Members
Pat John (1953-2022), actor in The Beachcombers

References

External links

Coast Salish governments
Shishalh
Sunshine Coast (British Columbia)